Dead Man's Party may refer to:

 Dead Man's Party (album), 1985 album by Oingo Boingo
 "Dead Man's Party" (song), the title song of the above album; released as a single in 1986
 "Dead Man's Party" (Buffy the Vampire Slayer), second episode of the third season of Buffy the Vampire Slayer
 "Dead Man's Party", third episode of the first season of Shadowhunters (2016)